Dream 6: Middle Weight Grandprix 2008 Final Round was a mixed martial arts event  promoted by Fighting and Entertainment Group's mixed martial arts promotion Dream on September 23, 2008. The event hosted the crowning of Dream's first Middleweight Champion, Gegard Mousasi, after the conclusion of the Middleweight Grand Prix.

Background
A bout between Ronaldo Souza and Frank Trigg was announced for the Middleweight Grand Prix. Trigg would subsequently announce that a visa wasn't secured and the bout between the two wasn't finalized. Trigg was replaced by National university freestyle wrestling champion Ian Murphy.

Jason Miller made his DREAM debut, facing Katsuyori Shibata in the first round of the Grand Prix.

Taiei Kin was pitted against Ikuhisa Minowa, while Gegard Mousasi was expected to fight the PRIDE 2006 Welterweight Grand Prix finalist Denis Kang. Yoon Dong-Sik was booked to fight Shungo Oyama.

Japanese superstar Kazushi Sakuraba faced Andrews Nakahara.

The last fight announced was Kiyoshi Tamura against Masakatsu Funaki.

Results

2008 Middleweight Grand Prix bracket

** = Replacement

Dream Middleweight Grand Prix Reserve Bouts:
 Melvin Manhoef def.  Dae Won Kim at Dream 3
 Andrews Nakahara def.  Yoon Dong-sik at Dream 6

Notes 
 Badr Hari approached the ring prior to the Middle-Weight Final bout and challenged the Dream Heavyweight fighters to a match against him at the K-1 Dynamite Show in Tokyo. He also insulted the performance of the competitors by stating "All I've seen tonight is a bunch of hugging and kissing"
 Fedor Emelianenko announced his desire to participate in Dream's New Year show: Fields Dynamite!! 2008 on December 31 at the Saitama Super Arena. He was expected to face the winner of the Cro Cop vs. Overeem bout, but due to the No Contest, his opponent remained undecided.
 Joachim Hansen addressed the crowd and announced his participation at Fields Dynamite!! 2008, with his opponent to be determined.
 A number of World Victory Road fighters were in attendance and Yoshihiro Akiyama hinted at a potential merger on the horizon by declaring he wanted to fight Hidehiko Yoshida next. Notable WVR fighters at Dream.6 included Takanori Gomi, Xande Ribeiro, and Josh Barnett.
 The Average TBS broadcast rating was 9.0 with a peak of 13.4 during the Akiyama vs. Tonooka fight. Announced attendance was 25,000.
 Mirko Cro Cop was taken to a hospital for treatment and was unavailable for post-fight comments.

Tournament bonuses
Semifinalists Zelg Galesic and Melvin Manhoef both earned a 1,000,000円 bonus for their performance in the tournament.
Runner-up Ronaldo 'Jacare' Souza received a 3,000,000円 bonus for his efforts.
Winner Gegard Mousasi earned a 10,000,000円 bonus to become Dream's first Middle-Weight Champion.

See also 
 Dream (mixed martial arts)
 List of Dream champions
 2008 in DREAM

References

External links
Dream 6 official card

Dream (mixed martial arts) events
2008 in mixed martial arts
Mixed martial arts in Japan
Sport in Saitama (city)
2008 in Japan